Sarens is a Belgian multinational company headquartered in Wolvertem, Belgium. Its business includes, heavy lift, engineered transport, and crane rental services. It produces a variety of equipment including cranes, transportation, gantries, jacking products, and other heavy lifting products.

History

Sarens was founded by Frans Sarens in 1921 for forestry works and the transportation of trees using horses and carts. Soon, the company entered the mechanical transportation and lifting industry. It was incorporated on the 2nd of September in 1955. The company’s equipment has been used for projects including cement plant repairs, sea port operations, bridge construction, canal expansion (including the Panama Canal), mass transit construction, sports arenas, and power plant installations as well as repairs, such as the Chernobyl Nuclear Plant. Sarens has completed lifts with cranes stationed on both land and floating on the water.

Sarens has acquired companies over the years including the UK firm G W Sparrow and Sons in 1997, the crane rental business of the Dutch firm Riwal in 2007, the American firm Rigging International in 2009, the Polish firm Zuraw Grohman in 2010, and Canada Crane Services in 2010. They also have strategic partnerships with companies including Omega Morgan. Sarens was a winner and finalist in the 2015, 2016, and 2017 ESTA Awards.

Equipment

SGC-120 

The SGC-120 is a versatile heavy lift ring crane and is the product of the combined engineering efforts of Sarens and its acquired company, Rigging International from California in 2009. The SGC‐120 is the world’s only Third Generation, 120,000 Tm (3200 metric ton lifting capacity). The crane is designed for the heavy lifting requirements in refinery work, oil and gas, mining, offshore platforms, and components for nuclear power plants. The SGC‐120 first became available in 2011.

CS5000 
The CS5000 was developed for the jacking of very-heavy structures and modules.

SGC-250
Sarens claims that this crane, completed in November 2018, is the largest land based crane in the world. It  has a maximum reach of 275 metres or maximum height of about 250 metres. Its maximum lifting capacity is 5,000 metric tons. It has retractable bogies so that it may be repositioned within its working site without the need for dismantling. In September 2019, it began operations at the Hinkley Point C nuclear power station construction site in Somerset, England.

Other Equipments 
The company has a wide range of other cranes, which lift from 50 MT to 1650 MT.

Corporate governance 
The CEO of the company is Wim Sarens, who represents the fifth generation of the Sarens family management.
The president of the company is Ludo Sarens (father of Wim Sarens), who represents the fourth generation of the Sarens family in management of the company. In 2017, the company had about 4400 employees.

References

External links 

1921 establishments in Belgium
Crane manufacturers
Manufacturing companies of Belgium